AMDA or Amda may refer to:
 AMDA – Dedicated to Long Term Care Medicine, the organization formerly known as the American Medical Directors Association
 American Musical and Dramatic Academy, a college conservatory for the performing arts in New York City and Los Angeles
 9-Aminomethyl-9,10-dihydroanthracene, an organic compound 
 Anglo-Malayan Defence Agreement or Anglo-Malaysian Defence Agreement, a 1957 bilateral defence agreement

People with the name
 Amda Iyasus, emperor of Ethiopia
 Amda Seyon (disambiguation), three different emperors of Ethiopia